Thomas McCain was a farmer and state legislator in Mississippi.

Early life 
McCain was born in Tennessee.

Career
He represented DeSoto County in the Mississippi House of Representatives from 1872 to 1875. He was an officer in the county militia.

Personal life 
He was married and had children.

See also
 African-American officeholders during and following the Reconstruction era

References

Members of the Mississippi House of Representatives
Year of birth missing